Risum may refer to
 Risong Township, in Tibet;
 Risum-Lindholm 10 pass, a municipality in Germany.

See also
 Risum Round Barn